This is a list of bridges in the city of Toronto, Ontario, Canada.

Roadway bridges

Ravine and river bridges
List of bridges that cross over the Toronto ravine system and its waterways:

Don River
Bridges over the Don River ravine, listed from south to north
 Cherry Street lift bridge
 Gardiner Expressway
 pedestrian and bicycle bridge on the Waterfront Trail
 Don Valley Parkway northbound on ramp from Gardiner Expressway
 Don Valley Parkway southbound on ramp to Gardiner Expressway
 CNR Don River Bridge - a five lane railway bridge, part of the Corridor (VIA) c.
 Old Eastern Avenue Bridge

 Don Valley Parkway off ramp to westbound Eastern Avenue
 Queen Street Viaduct
 Dundas Street c. 1911
 Gerrard Street

 Plate girder railway bridge
 Prince Edward Viaduct carrying Bloor Street and the Bloor–Danforth line
 Rosedale Valley Bridge - built 1917 by Dominion Bridge Company and designed by Thomas Taylor 
 Bloor Bayview Ramp for Don Valley Parkway access c. 1960
 Half Mile Railway Bridge c. 1928
 Pottery Road pre-1950
 Railway bridge
 Beechwood Drive bridge, part of Don Valley bicycle trail
 Railway Bridge
Leaside Bridge

East Don River
 Don Mills Road
 Bridge providing road access to E.T. Seton Park
 Don Valley Parkway
 Railway bridge
 Bridge in Flemingdon Park Golf Club (south)
 Bridge in Flemingdon Park Golf Club (north)
 Eglinton Avenue bridge
 Railway bridge, north-south line - 3 crossings
 Railway bridge, east-west line
 Lawrence Avenue - replaced smaller concrete arch bridge, formerly Bayview Avenue Bridge
 Don Valley Parkway
 Donalda Golf and Country Club - 11 bridges
 York Mills Road bridge
 Don Mills Road bridge
 Duncan Mill Road bridge
 Pedestrian bridge
 Sheppard Avenue & Leslie Street Intersection
 Railway bridge
 Finch Avenue East just west of Leslie Street
 Cummer Avenue bridge
 Steeles Avenue East just west of Bayview Avenue
 Steeles Avenue East just east of Leslie Street

Taylor Massey Creek
Taylor Massey Creek is a tributary of the East Don River.
 Don Valley Parkway bridge
 O'Connor Drive Woodbine Bridge - c. 1931 large concrete arch bridge
 Dawes Road bridge
 Victoria Park Avenue bridge
 Pharmacy Avenue bridge

West Don River
 Overlea Boulevard bridge (Charles H. Hiscott Bridge c. 1960)
 Railway bridge
 Eglinton Avenue East bridge
 Bayview Avenue north of Lawrence Avenue East

 Hogg's Hollow Bridge, MacDonald-Cartier Freeway (401)
 Sheppard Avenue Bridge east of Bathurst Street

Humber River
 Finch Avenue and Islington Avenue - twin intersecting bridges Humber River
 Rowntree Mill Road Bridge - former road bridge for Rowntree Mill Road Over Humber River, now pedestrian traffic only
 Highway 27
 Martin Grove Road
 Kipling Avenue
 Albion Road - concrete box girder bridge for vehicular traffic c. 1970s to replace the previous bridge that later became a pedestrian crossing
 Musson's or Flindon Road bridge - c. 1910 Warren truss bridge located near the current Albion Road bridge and demolished 1960; it replaced an earlier bridge built in late 1830s to carry the Weston Plank Road.
 The Queensway
 Steeles Avenue West over the Humber River (west of Islington Avenue)
 Scarlett Road
 St Phillip's Road
 Guelph Radial Line Bridge - c. 1917 and bridge removed after 1931; footing reused for current pedestrian bridge
 Lambton/Dundas Street Bridge c. 1929 
 Lambton Mills Bridge - c. 1907 and demolished 1955; only abutments remain
 Old Mill Bridge spanning Humber River, connecting Old Mill Rd. and Catherine St. c. 1916
 Bloor Humber Bridge - c. 1924, metal hinged solid ribbed spandrel braced deck arch bridge has been rehabilitated in 1980 and 2010

Other

 Avenue of the Islands bridge - on Toronto Islands
 Cherry Street Bridge over the Keating Shipping Channel
 Kingston Road over the Rouge River
 Mount Pleasant Road north of Blythwood Road over Blythwood Ravine Park
 Markham Road between Lawrence Avenue East and Eglinton Avenue East (West Highland Creek, part of the Highland Creek watershed)
 Bathurst Street over Cedarvale Park (Castle Frank Brook)
 Rouge River Bridge carrying Highway 401 over the Rouge River
 Bridge carrying Tywn Rivers Drive over the Rouge River
 Bridge carrying Kirkham Road over the Rouge River - built in 1955, it was closed and now demolished
 Bridges (2) carrying Meadowvale Road over the Rouge River
 Bridge carrying Steeles Avenue over the Rouge River
 Railway bridge and pedestrian bridge over the mouth of the Rouge River
 Sewells Road Suspension Bridge carries single lane of traffic over Rouge River
 Shoreham Drive over Black Creek
 Overpasses on Jane Street over Black Creek - north of Wilson Avenue and south of Highway 401
 Overpass over Black Creek at Humber Boulevard and Weston Road
 Bridge over Black Creek at Alliance Avenue and Hilldale Road
 Bridge over Black Creek on Rockcliffe Boulevard
 Unwin Avenue Bridge - single lane bailey bridge (new replacing original) located in the Portlands area for vehicular traffic over outlet/slip for the former Hearn Generating Station out into Toronto Outer Harbour and now twinned with new bridge for pedestrians and cyclists (replacing small walkway built next to bailey bridge).
 Vale of Avoca Bridge over Yellow Creek, also known as St. Clair Viaduct

Other roadway bridges

Roadway overpasses
List of bridges or overpasses over other roadways:

 Avenue Road over Highway 401 (rebuilding 2018-2019)
 Don Mills Road over Highway 401 (refurbished by City of Toronto)
 Lawrence Avenue East over the Don Valley Parkway
 Lawrence Avenue West over Allen Road
 Glencairn Avenue over Allen Road
 Finch Avenue East over the Highway 404
 Sheppard Avenue East over the Highway 404
 Steeles Avenue East over the Highway 404
 Victoria Park Avenue over Highway 401 (rebuilt)
 Wynford Drive over the Don Valley Parkway
 Flemington Road over Allen Road
 Wilson Heights Boulevard over Transit Road
 Mount Pleasant Road over Rosedale Valley Road
 Glen Road over Reservation Park Drive
 Governor's Road over Mud Creek
 Bloor Street East over Rosedale Valley Road
 Queen Street East over Don Valley Parkway
 Gerrard Street East over Don Valley Parkway
 Dundas Street East over Don Valley Parkway
 Dundas Street West over Kipling Avenue
 Bloor Street West over Kipling Avenue
 Bloor Street West over Highway 427
 Dundas Street West over Highway 427
 Burnhamthorpe Road over Highway 427
 Rathburn Road over Highway 427
 Dixon Road over Highway 27
 Highway 401 off ramp over Yonge Street (rebuilt)
 Highway 401 over Bathurst Street south of Wilson Avenue
 Highway 401 over Wilson Avenue east of Bathurst Street
 Albion Road over Weston Road
 Highway 401 over Warden Avenue (rebuilt 2012-2013)
 Highway 401 over Wendell Avenue
 Highway 400 over Wilson Avenue
 Highway 400 over Finch Avenue West
 Highway 401 over Keele Street - (rebuilt 2012-2013)
 Sheppard Avenue West over Ontario Highway 400
 Highway 400 over Steeles Avenue West - c. 1961 with only four lanes of Steeles on the southside with north span crossing a dirt road and roughed in for future widening of Steeles Avenue West.
 Highway 400 over Jane Street
 Dufferin Street bridges over Gardiner Expressway
 Westbound Lake Shore Boulevard West over Gardiner Expressway
 Eastern Avenue west of Don Valley Parkway
 Finch Avenue West over Highway 427
 Morningstar Drive over Highway 427
 Rexdale Boulevard over Highway 427
 Browns Line over Lake Shore Blvd West
 Spanbridge Road over Don Valley Parkway
 St. Dennis Drive over Don Valley Parkway
 Eglinton Avenue over Don Valley Parkway
 Van Horne Avenue over Highway 404
 McNicoll Avenue over Highway 404
 Jameson Avenue bridge over rail corridor north of Gardiner Expressway b. 2004 to replace earlier structure

Railway overpasses
List of bridges over railway lines (to avoid need for at grade level crossings):

 Highway 27 (Ontario) south of Steeles Avenue West over CN tracks
 Markham Road north of Sheppard Avenue East over CP tracks connecting to CP Agincourt Marshalling Yard
 Eglinton Avenue East between Midland Avenue and Kennedy Road over CN and TTC RT tracks
 Lawrence Avenue East between Midland Avenue and Kennedy Road over CN and TTC RT tracks
 Ellesmere Road between Midland Avenue and Kennedy Road over CN and TTC RT tracks
 Dowling Avenue Bridge carries CN freight and GO Transit commuter trains near Dowling Avenue
 Dunn Avenue Bridge carries CN freight and GO Transit commuter trains near Dunn Avenue
 Spadina Avenue over tracks north of Gardiner Expressway - replaced an earlier plate girder bridge that was replaced when the Spadina LRT route was rebuilt in the 1990s. Below are tracks for VIA, GO Transit commuter and Union Pearson Express trains
 
Dufferin Street Truss Bridge a double span over the Gardiner Expressway (c.1958) and over the rail corridor (steel arch bridge c.1911-12); latter to be demolished for new structure after 2016. Below are tracks for VIA, GO Transit commuter and Union Pearson Express trains
 Yonge Street Railway Overpass near St. Clair Avenue
 Victoria Park Avenue north of Lawrence Avenue East over Canadian Pacific tracks
 Pharmacy Avenue between Lawrence Avenue East and Ellesmere Road over Canadian Pacific tracks
 Birchmount Road just south of 401 CP tracks
 Kingston Road at Guildwood over Tracks

Pedestrian bridges
See also

 Amsterdam Bridge - spans over Simcoe Street Slip from York Quay to Rees Street Slip
 Farr Avenue bridge over Finch Avenue West east of Kipling Avenue (connects broken sections of Farr Avenue)
 Finch Avenue East - Pedestrian Warren truss bridge over Finch Avenue East west of Leslie Street to provide access to GO Old Cummer station
 Flindon Road bridge over Humber - The bridge was formerly the old routing of Albion Road and two earlier bridges and replaced in 1990s when the new Albion overpass was widened
 Chorley Park Bridge - built 1911 for Chorley Park (old Government House) and now path in a city park
 Fort York Pedestrian and Cycle Bridge - Garrison crossing
 Glen Cedar Road Bridge - c. 1989 (restoration by Alan Seymour) is a replica of the 1912 bridge (by C.H. and P.H. Mitchell, Engineers) built by Sir Henry Pellatt to span over Cedarvale Ravine and Belt Line railway and now over Rosedale Valley Road
 Glen Manor Drive Bridge - Warren truss bridge connecting Pine Glen Road and Williamson Road over Glen Stewart Ravine in the Beaches neighbourhood)
 Heath Street East - spans over Mud Creek Ravine (Moore Park) connecting the broken section of Health Street between Brendan Road and Hudson Drive
 Humber Bay Arch Bridge - c.1996 span over the mouth of Humber River flowing out to Lake Ontario and carries pedestrian and bike traffic
 Innes Avenue (over CN railway line to Prescott Ave)
 Lake Shore Boulevard Bailey Bridge - crossing over Lake Shore Boulevard West from Exhibition Place to waterfront
 Ontario Place bridges - two pedestrian bridges crossing over Lake Shore Boulevard West from Exhibition Place
 MacLennan Avenue pedestrian bridge ("The Ramp", over railway tracks and Carstowe Road)
 Tara-Mooregate Pedestrian Bridge - A bridge that connects the Gatineau Hydro Trail, Tara Ave and Moorgate Ave over the GO Train Stouffville tracks and TTC's Scarborough RT Tracks
 Morley Callaghan Footbridge - spans Rosedale Valley Ravine was built in 1992 and restored in 2001 and 2015; major work 2022-2024
 Mimico Creek Bridge (Santiago Calatrava) - similar to the Amsterdam cable footbridge
 Old Finch Avenue Bailey Bridge - crosses over Rouge River
 Pape Avenue - Pedestrian bridge over CN/GO Rail corridor - Pape Avenue north of Gerrard Street East is broken by railway tracks
 Puente de Luz (Bridge of Light) from CityPlace, Toronto over railway below to Front Street West
 Riverdale Park - pedestrian bridge connecting east and west sides of Riverdale Park
 Shoreham Drive - Pedestrian bridge over Shoreham Drive east of Jane Street to access Shoreham Public Sports and Wellness Academy on the south side of Shoreham Drive
 SkyWalk - connecting Union Station to the CN Tower
 Steeles Pedestrian Overpasses - two spans sandwiches rail overpass carrying GO Transit Stouffville line over Steeles Avenue East just east of Kennedy Road; completion 2022
 Sunnyside bridge - from Roncesvalles Avenue to Lake Ontario shoreline
 Wallace Avenue Footbridge - c. 1907 is a series of Warren truss sections on trestle like support structure spanning over railway tracks below; staircases sections on both ends have been replaced
 Woodsworth Road  -Pedestrian bridge over CN tracks south of Highway 401 from the path leading from Woodsworth Road (Woodsworth Parkette) to GO Oriole station on the south side of eastbound 401 collectors
 Weston GO Station Pedestrian Bridge spans Lawrence Avenue West on the west side of the railway tracks

Railway bridges

 railway tracks over Bloor St W, east of Dundas St W.
 railway tracks over Bloor St W, east of Symington 
 Transit train traffic* railway tracks over Wickett Creek south of Eglinton Avenue East and Leslie Street
 railway tracks over Wickett Creek east of Leslie Street on Eglinton Avenue East
 railway tracks over Baview Avenue at Don Valley Brick Works
 railway tracks over Rouge River at Lake Ontario
 railway tracks over Sheppard Avenue East between Brimley Road and Midland Avenue
 railway tracks over Rouge River at Morningside Heights
 railway tracks over Rouge River near Meadowvale Road and Plug Hat Road
 railway tracks over Humber River at Lambton Park
 railway tracks over Humber River between The Queensway and Gardiner Expressway
 railway tracks over Humber River at Old Mills Inn
 Weston CNR Bridge - c. 1856 box girder bridge for Grand Trunk Railway over Humber River at Weston Golf and Country Club
 railway tracks over Don Mills Road south of Barber Green Road
 steel box girder bridge carries CN freight and GO Transit commuter trains over Leslie Street south of Highway 401
 concrete bridge carries CN and GO Transit railway tracks over Finch Avenue East west of Leslie Street
 Lambton Credit Valley Railway/CPR Bridge - c. 1874 steel plate girder bridge over Humber River
 Indian Line CNR Bridge - c.1959-1965 and spans over Humber River
 2 bridges - steel plate bridge over Eglinton Avenue East at Leslie Street and a long steel trestle over Don River and E.T. Seton Park south of Eglinton Avenue East and just east of Leslie Street ending just north of Wicksteed Avenue
 2 bridges at intersection of Warden Avenue and Ellesmere Road CP rail tracks heading to Agincourt Yards
 2 bridges St Clair Avenue East and Midland Avenue CN and GO tracks site of infamous GO train and TTC bus accident
 CN tracks over Black Creek Drive north of Weston Road
 CN tracks over Queen Street West between Gladstone Avenue and Dufferin Street
 Lakeshore CNR Bridge/Western Railway Bridge abutments c 1911 and 1890
 railway tracks over King Street Bridge c. 1888
 railway tracks over Keele Street Bridge c. 1891
 railway tracks over Lansdowne Avenue Bridge c. 1907
 Old Mill TTC Subway Bridge - c. 1968 concrete bridge carries Bloor subway line over Humber and located just south of Bloor Humber Bridge
 Steeles Railway Overpasses -  carrying GO Transit Stouffville line over Steeles Avenue East just east of Kennedy Road; completion 2022

Other bridges over waterways
Numerous bridges on the Toronto Islands including:
 Algonquin Island bridge - c. 1938 trestle bridge made of timber used for pedestrian traffic and plans for the current bridge to be replaced with a replica
 Centre Island Bridge (on Avenue of the Islands) metal brace spandrel arch pedestrian bridge built before 1896 and altered since; used by parks service vehicles with weight limitation
 Olympic Island Bridge (2) - concrete spandrel deck arch pedestrian bridge built sometime before 1910
 Chippewa Avenue Bridge -built around 1911 for Royal Canadian Yacht Club

Buried bridges
 Crawford Street Bridge
 Harbord Street Bridge

Lost bridges
 Lawrence Avenue Bridge - concrete bridge replaced by current overpass over DVP; bridge removed in conjunction with widening by 1963. East and west abutments are still present along Don River.
 Avenue Road Bridge - connecting Avenue Road to Yonge Street in 1929 was incorporated into Hogg's Hollow Bridge
 Yonge Street Bridge - steel truss bridge south of Hogg's Hollow (York Mills Road) carried Yonge Street traffic over West branch of the Don River and (North Yonge Railways ran on single track on the outer west side of bridge until 1948) until 1954 when it washed out during Hurricane Hazel. A temporary bailey bridge was built after November 1954 and now replaced by current overpass after May 1955.
 Raymore Park footbridge over Humber washed out by Hurricane Hazel and rebuilt. Since replaced by new bridge in 1995; old suspension bridge abutments are still present.
 Dowling Avenue Bridge and Dunn Avenue Bridge - 2 plate girder bridges built in 1911 crossed over railway tracks north of the Gardiner Expressway torn down in 2016 and being replaced with new structures (temporary pedestrian only bridges to built in the summer of 2016).
 Lakeshore Road Bridge - c. 1824 log bridge that spanned across Humber River replacing a ferry service c.1803
 Shaw Street Bridge - a wood bridge over Sully Crescent and Garrison Creek. Bridge removed and was filled in by the 1920s

See also
List of oldest buildings and structures in Toronto

References

Bridges in Toronto
Toronto
Toronto